The Cape Town Railway & Dock 2-4-0T of 1864 was a South African steam locomotive from the pre-Union era in the Cape of Good Hope.

A railway line between Salt River and Wynberg, constructed with private capital, was opened to the public on 19 December 1864. Three  locomotives were acquired as motive power for the line, one by the Wynberg Railway Company and the other two by the Cape Town Railway and Dock Company, who undertook to rent and operate the Wynberg line.

In 1872, the locomotives came onto the roster of the Cape Government Railways when it took over the operation of all railways in the Cape of Good Hope. They remained in service on the Wynberg line until after its conversion to dual gauge broad-and-Cape gauges, which began around 1872, and were retired in 1881 when sufficient Cape gauge locomotives were in service.

Wynberg Railway
While the  broad gauge Cape Town-Wellington Railway was still being built, the independent Wynberg Railway Company was formed. It constructed a broad gauge line to Wynberg from a junction with the Wellington line at Salt River. Work commenced on 19 December 1862 and the line was completed and opened to traffic two years later to the day, on 19 December 1864. The company acquired one  locomotive from Robert Stephenson and Company and named it after Mr. Watson, the general manager. When the Cape Government Railways was established, this locomotive became its engine no. 12.

The  locomotive had its cylinders arranged outside the engine frame and was equipped with Stephenson Link valve gear.

Cape Town Railway and Dock
Operation of the line was contracted to the Cape Town Railway and Dock Company at a rental of £3,600 per year. The new Wynberg line proved to be popular and it was soon found necessary to acquire additional locomotives to cope with the rapidly increasing passenger traffic on the Cape's first suburban line. Early in 1865, two more  locomotives, identical to the first and numbered 10 and 11, were therefore delivered to Cape Town Railway and Dock from Robert Stephenson and Company. As was the practice then, they were also named, in this case after two of the directors of the company.

Very little is known about these locomotives and author Frank Holland could not find sufficient information about them to prepare a dimensional diagram, like he managed to do with virtually every other locomotive which is described in his publications of 1971 and 1972. In addition, very few photographs of them exist, since even the art of photography was still new technology at the Cape in the 1860s.

These three locomotives, together with the eight 0-4-2 tender locomotives, worked the Cape Town-Wynberg and Cape Town-Wellington lines respectively, from the time they were opened to traffic until well after the time the Cape Government Railways was established and the Wynberg Railway Company and Cape Town Railway and Dock Company ceased to exist.

Cape Government Railways

Following the passing of Cape Act no. 10 in December 1872, the Colonial government established the Cape Government Railways to undertake the management and construction of railways in the Cape of Good Hope. In 1873, it purchased the Cape Town-Wellington Railway for the sum of £773,000 and, in 1875, the Salt River-Wynberg line for the sum of £75,000.

No more broad gauge locomotives were acquired, since it had been decided by Parliament to continue railway construction from Wellington into the interior, but to use the narrower  gauge, later to become almost universally known as Cape gauge. This gauge was decided upon since it would decrease the cost of construction through the difficult terrain beyond the coastal plain and up the Hex River mountains.

While the new Cape gauge line was being constructed, the existing broad gauge lines were dual-gauged. The Cape Town-Wellington and Salt River-Wynberg sections were eventually worked by locomotives of both gauges.

Disposal
The locomotives remained in service until 1881, when sufficient numbers of Cape gauge locomotives were in service and it was decided to remove all broad gauge track and rolling stock. The broad gauge track's  iron rails were lifted and the track was relaid to Cape gauge as rapidly as possible, using  steel rail sections on creosoted wooden sleepers. In that same year, the extension of the suburban line from Wynberg to Kalk Bay was authorised.

All the broad gauge locomotives were dismantled, with the exception of their boilers. These were thoroughly overhauled and converted into stationary boilers, used to drive workshop machinery.

Works numbers
The locomotive numbers, works numbers, original owners and names are listed in the table.

References

0030
2-4-0T locomotives
1′B locomotives
Robert Stephenson and Company locomotives
4 ft 8½ in gauge locomotives
Railway locomotives introduced in 1864
1864 in South Africa
Scrapped locomotives